Bruce F. Chorpita is an American researcher and clinical psychologist who has worked in multiple academic and government leadership positions addressing youth mental health and improvement of clinical practice. He currently is Professor of Psychology at the University of California, Los Angeles. He received his Ph.D. in psychology from the University at Albany, State University of New York. He is widely published in the areas of children's mental health services, with funding from the National Institute of Mental Health, the Hawaii Departments of Education and Health, the John D. and Catherine T. MacArthur Foundation, the Annie E. Casey Foundation, and the William T. Grant Foundation. He is co-founder and president of PracticeWise, reflecting his commitment to making knowledge and science work better to improve the lives of children and families.

Education 
In May 1989, Chorpita graduated from Brown University in Providence, Rhode Island with a Bachelor of Arts in Psychology. Following the completion of his undergraduate career, Chorpita went on to pursue a doctoral degree from the University at Albany, under the mentorship of David H. Barlow, Ph.D, ABPP. While at the University at Albany, Chorpita authored his thesis, Family Influences on Cognitive Processing in Children with Anxiety, as well as his dissertation, Influences of Over-Controlling Parenting Style on Anxiety and Negative Affect: An Evaluation of Preliminary Structural Etiological Models. Chorpita completed his Pre-doctoral Clinical Residency at the University of Mississippi Medical Center in Jackson, Mississippi under the mentorship of Ronald S. Drabman, Ph.D, ABPP. Chorpita was awarded his Ph.D. in Clinical Psychology from the University at Albany in Albany, New York in August of 1997.

Positions 
As an extension of his research and intervention implementation, Chorpita served as the President of the Association for Behavioral and Cognitive Therapies. Chorpita held the position of Clinical Director of the Child and Adolescent Mental Health Division of the Hawaii State Department of Health, serving between 2001 and 2003. Chorpita held a faculty position with the Department of Psychology at the University of Hawaii between 1997 and 2008.

Chorpita served as the lead developer for the intensive treatment component of PRIDE, a project designed around the aim of developing, testing, and disseminating effective treatments and training modules for lay counselors to address anxiety, depression, and anger problems among adolescents in India. As part of his work with PRIDE, Chorpita worked closely with Vikram Patel, who served as Principal Investigator of the project.

From 2021 to 2022, Chorpita served the National Academy of Sciences as a Committee Member for Accelerating Behavioral Science Through Ontology Development and Use. As a component of this position, Chorpita worked with a team of scientists to establish a commitment to a shared conceptualization and set of terms and relationships within the field of behavioral science. The mission of this work is to help set the stage for scientific discovery, evidence retrieval and application (e.g. through clinical knowledge appliances), and automated reasoning. 

Chorpita is the current President of PracticeWise, LLC, a consulting organization co-founded with Eric Daleiden, focused around the primary aim of providing decision support technology and training to both clinicians and mental health organizations on a national scale. PracticeWise centers its efforts around a primarily scientific and evidence-based approach. PracticeWise regularly publishes a report detailing current evidence-based child and adolescent psycho-social interventions for the American Academy of Pediatrics. 

Chorpita is the current director of the Child FIRST Program at UCLA, whose work aims to improve the effectiveness of mental health service delivery to children. Child FIRST strives to advance mental health treatment design, clinical decision-making, information delivery models, mental health system architecture, and mental health system processes with the interest of bettering children's health primarily in mind. Child FIRST creates and maintains partnerships with community agencies to deliver mental health services both throughout California, and the country as a whole.

Chorpita currently holds the role of professor of clinical psychology with the University of California, Los Angeles Psychology and Biobehavioral Sciences Department. Chorpita's primary area of study is Clinical Psychology, and he serves as the Principal Investigator for the Chorpita Research Lab.

Research 
Chorpita has published in the area of child and adolescent mental health services, and has authored research pertaining to the evidence-based examination and treatment of childhood anxiety disorders. Chorpita has authored more than 300 scientific papers and in 2006 published one of the first books on modular cognitive behavior therapy with Guilford Press. Chorpita's research centers around the primary area of Clinical Psychology, with the central aim of advancing the effectiveness of current mental health practice technologies for children and adolescents, through evidence-based approaches. Chorpita is the lead author of the protocol, along with John R. Weisz, an evidence-based treatment that outperformed multiple other evidence-based treatments in two randomized effectiveness trials in three different states. Chorpita's ongoing research is aimed at improving the effectiveness of mental health service systems for children through innovation in mental health treatment design, clinical decision-making, information-delivery models, and service system architecture.

Honors and awards 
Throughout his academic career, Chorpita has held research and training grants from the National Institute of Mental Health, the Hawaii Departments of Education and Health, Los Angeles County Department of Mental Health, the John D. and Catherine T. MacArthur Foundation, as well as the Annie E. Casey Foundation, receiving a sum exceeding twenty-five million dollars in research funding.

Selected publications 
Below is a selection of Chorpita's most frequently cited and pivotal work. 
 Brown, T. A., Chorpita, B. F., Korotitsch, W, Barlow, D. H. (1997). Psychometric properties of the Depression Anxiety Stress Scales (DASS) in clinical samples. Behavior Research and Therapy, 35(1), 79-89. 
 Chorpita, B. F., Barlow, D. H. (1998). The development of anxiety: The role of control in the early environment. Psychological Bulletin, 124(1), 3-21. American Psychological Association. 
 Brown, T. A., Chorpita, B. F., Barlow, D. H. (1998, May).  Structural relationships among dimensions of the DSM-IV anxiety and mood disorders and dimensions of negative affect, positive affect, and autonomic arousal. In Journal of abnormal psychology (Vol. 107(2), pp. 179-192). American Psychological Association. 
 Chorpita, B. F., Yim, L., Moffitt, C., Umemoto, L. A., Francis, S. E. (2000, January). Assessment of symptoms of DSM-IV anxiety and depression in children: A revised child anxiety and depression scale. In Behaviour research and therapy (Vol. 38(8), pp. 835-855). Pergamon. 
 Weisz, J. R., Chorpita, B. F., Palinkas, L. A., Schoenwald, S. K, Miranda, J., Bearman, S. K., Daleiden, E. L., Ugueto, A. M., Ho, A., Martin, J., Gray, J., Alleyne, A., Langer, D. A., Southam-Gerow, M. A., Gibbons, R. D., Research Network on Youth Mental Health (2012, March). Testing standard and modular designs for psychotherapy treating depression, anxiety, and conduct problems in youth: A randomized effectiveness trial. In Archives of general psychiatry (Vol. 69(3), pp. 274-282). American Medical Association.   
 Albano, A. M., Chorpita, B. F., Barlow, D. H. (2003). Childhood anxiety disorders. In Child psychopathology (pp. 279-329). Guilford Press. via APA PsycInfo.

References 

Brown University alumni
University at Albany, SUNY alumni
University of Mississippi Medical Center alumni
University of California, Los Angeles faculty
American clinical psychologists
Psychology educators
American psychology writers
Child psychologists
Year of birth missing (living people)
Living people